Anna Amalie Abert or Anna Abert (19 September 1906 – 4 January 1996) was a German musicologist.

Life
Abert was born in Halle (Saale) in 1906.

Abert was the daughter of the music historian Hermann Abert. She studied with Hans Joachim Moser and Friedrich Blume at the University of Kiel. From 1943 to 1971 she worked at the university. In 1950 she became a professor.
She has studied the works of Heinrich Schütz, Monteverdi , Gluck and Richard Strauss.

Abert wrote a thesis on the 1625 Cantiones sacrae by Heinrich Schütz which was published in 1935.

In 1962 she published her book on the history of opera.

In 1964 she published a thesis which convincingly argued that Symphony, K. 45a was an unknown work by Mozart.

Abert died in Kiel in 1996 at age 89.

References

External links 

1906 births
1996 deaths
Writers from Halle (Saale)
Women musicologists
20th-century German musicologists
20th-century women musicians
Recipients of the Cross of the Order of Merit of the Federal Republic of Germany